Prashant Thakur  is an Indian politician from Maharashtra. He is a member of the Bharatiya Janata Party.

Early life 
Thakur was born in Panvel on 5 August 1974, son of Ramsheth Changu Thakur and Shakuntala Thakur. Ramsheth Thakur is a former Member of Parliament (MP). Thakur started studying civil engineering but left after his second year.

He married Varsha Thakur and raised 2 children.

Political career
Thakur was elected to the Maharashtra Legislative Assembly from Panvel, Maharashtra in the 2009 Maharashtra Legislative Assembly election as a candidate from the Bharatiya Janata Party.

He served as Chairman of CIDCO, a politician in Panvel contested the 2014 Maharashtra Elections.

Thakur became President of the Raigad District Youth Congress Committee in 2005. He then became the President of the Panvel Municipal Corporation in 2006 and served until 2009.

Thakur is a member of the Board of Directors at Janardan Bhagat Shikshan Prasarak Sanstha in Panvel. He is the Managing Director at Shahu Institute of Information Technology Pvt. Ltd. 

He serves as Managing Director of the Shahu Institute of Information Technology and the Director of Malhar Network - the core entity which organizes the popular Malhar Mahotsav at CKT College, Panvel.

Controversies 
Thakur changed parties during his career. He first joined the PWP party. He then joined Congress party and then joined BJP. Former Uran MLA Vivek Patil warned Thakur to file PIL against him. He said "Thakur had used unfair means to acquire land for sports complex in Ulwe". The Shiv Sena-led Maharashtra government removed Thakur as chairman of CIDCO, which was building the Navi Mumbai international airport with a private player.

See also 
 Panvel (Vidhan Sabha constituency)
 Maharashtra Legislative Assembly

References

External links 
 

People from Navi Mumbai
Bharatiya Janata Party politicians from Maharashtra
Living people
Maharashtra MLAs 2004–2009
1974 births
Maharashtra MLAs 2014–2019
Indian National Congress politicians
Peasants and Workers Party of India politicians